Samadlu (also Romanized as Şamadlū; also known as Līt Valī Qeshlāqī) is a village in Azadlu Rural District, Muran District, Germi County, Ardabil Province, Iran. At the 2006 census, its population was 148, in 28 families.

References 

Towns and villages in Germi County